Coleophora principiella is a moth of the family Coleophoridae that is endemic to Algeria.

References

External links

principiella
Moths of Africa
Endemic fauna of Algeria
Moths described in 1888